Domenico Michiel was the 35th Doge of Venice. He reigned from 1117 to 1130.

In August 1122 Domenico Michiel led a Venetian fleet of 100 vessels and around 15,000 men for the defense of the Holy Land. The fleet sailed under the flag of St. Peter, which the Pope had sent to Michiel. Over the winter the fleet set siege to the Byzantine island of Corfu. The siege was cancelled in the spring when news arrived that King Baldwin II of Jerusalem had been captured by the Artuqids, and that the Kingdom of Jerusalem had subsequently been invaded by the Fatimids of Egypt. The Venetian fleet went to the defense of Jerusalem and defeated the Egyptian fleet off of the Syrian coast. The Venetians then landed at Acre; from there Michiel went to Jerusalem, where the Pactum Warmundi was signed granting Venice privileged trade concessions, tax freedoms, and even partial ownership of some cities within the Kingdom of Jerusalem.

On the return journey to Venice, the fleet looted Rhodes, attacked the islands Samos and Lesbos, and destroyed the city of Modon in the Peloponnese. Domenico Michiel triumphantly returned to Venice in June 1125. He had helped the Christians in the Holy Land and weakened the hostile Greeks. The inscription on Michiel's tomb does not describe him as a religious crusader, but rather as a terror Graecorum...et laus Venetorum ("A horror to the Greeks...and praise from the Venetians"). His dogaressa was Alicia.

12th-century Doges of Venice
Christians of the Crusades
1130 deaths